Sofia Bleckur, born 3 July 1984, is a Swedish former cross-country skier who competed in the World Cup level, and for IFK Mora. She won Tjejvasan in 2005 and 2014. On 5 August 2015 she announced her retirement from cross-country skiing.

Cross-country skiing results
All results are sourced from the International Ski Federation (FIS).

World Championships
 1 medal – (1 silver)

World Cup

Season standings

Team podiums
 1 podium – (1 )

References

External links

1984 births
Living people
Swedish female cross-country skiers
Place of birth missing (living people)
FIS Nordic World Ski Championships medalists in cross-country skiing
IFK Mora skiers
21st-century Swedish women